Hypatopa crescentella is a moth in the family Blastobasidae. It is found in North America, including Utah.

References

Moths described in 1910
Hypatopa